The Independent Music Awards (IMAs) is an international awards program created by Music Resource Group (MRG) in 2000 to recognize self-distributed recordings and releases from independent record labels. The IMAs honor works in over 100 categories that are evaluated by judges who are genre experts. The judges are celebrity musicians and artists.

Background 
The Independent Music Awards (IMAs) was launched in 2000 by Music Resource Group, publisher of music industry contact database The Musician’s Atlas/AtlasOnline.

Notable winners and nominees have included Valerie June, Killer Mike, ...And You Will Know Us by the Trail of Dead, Flying Lotus, Macy Gray, Five Finger Death Punch, Esprit D'Air, Reeve Carney, Roman Miroshnichenko, Simon Phillips, Foreigner, George Benson, Jeff Healey, Paul Wertico, Frank Colon, Marco Benevento, Roberto Tola, Paquito D’Rivera, Jake La Botz, and Pokey LaFarge.

Judging process 
A preliminary judging panel chooses up to five nominees in each category. Nominees are chosen on artistry and authenticity alone, not streams, likes, or marketing success. A panel of judges from across the world selects winners based on artistic merit. There are usually several celebrity judges.

In addition to the awards selected by judges, the IMAs also gives out Vox Pop awards determined by fan voting.

Judges have included Robert Smith of The Cure, Tom Waits, Gloria Gaynor, Keith Richards, Ann and Nancy Wilson of Heart, Judy Collins, Peter Gabriel, Roger Daltrey, Keith Urban, Snoop Dogg, Ozzy Osbourne, Tori Amos and Suzanne Vega.

Winners are announced at the annual award ceremony in New York City.

Best Album winners

2017

2018

2019

Best Song winners

2017

2018

2019

Best Music Producer winners

2018

2019 

In 2022, Wet Leg, Stormzy, Rina Sawayama, Nova Twins and Nia Archives were among the winners at the 2022 AIM Independent Music Awards, which were held at London’s Roundhouse on Wednesday (Sept. 28). The awards recognize the U.K. independent music sector.

References

External links 
 Past IMA Nominees and Winners

American music awards
Awards established in 2001